This is a list of the extreme communities in Canada and its provinces and territories. They are farther east, north, south or west than any other community, though they are generally not farther than the extreme points of Canadian provinces. The record latitude (in degrees north) or longitude (in degrees west) is given.

*Lloydminster lies on the Alberta/Saskatchewan border. Farthest east entirely within Alberta is Empress (110°0′22″W). Farthest west entirely within Saskatchewan is Govenlock in the southwest part of the province.**Flin Flon lies on the Saskatchewan / Manitoba border, however, the southeastern part of Saskatchewan is located much further to the east than Flin Flon.***The Canada-US border bends below 45°N in the region; the very southernmost point is where the Châteauguay River crosses the border.

See also 
Extreme points of Canadian provinces
Nordicity
Remote and isolated community

References

Extreme points of Canada
Canada